Corn Uí Mhuirí is the cup presented to the winners of the Munster colleges senior "A" football championship, the top level Gaelic football championship for secondary schools in Munster. The winners advance to the Hogan Cup, which is the All-Ireland colleges senior "A" football championship.

The competition begins with a round-robin system of four groups of three teams. The top two teams in each group advance to the knock-out stage.

The competition was established in 1927 by Dr. Eamon O'Sullivan and Canon Breen at a meeting in Mallow.

The holders are St Brendan's College, Killarney, who defeated Tralee CBS in the 2022 Final, played at Fitzgerald Stadium on 29 January 2022.

Wins listed by college

Finals listed by year

 Teams in bold went on to win the Hogan Cup in the same year.

See also
 Hogan Cup
 Connacht Championship
 Leinster Championship
 MacRory Cup (Ulster Championship)
 Dr Harty Cup (Hurling Championship)

References

Sources
 
 

1927 establishments in Ireland
Gaelic football competitions in Munster
Gaelic football cup competitions